Kitson is an upmarket department store chain whose head store is on Robertson Boulevard in Los Angeles. This store is a well-known place for celebrity spotting, especially by paparazzi.

Company 
Kitson is a pop culture iconic brand that was established in 2000 on Robertson Blvd in Los Angeles, California. Kitson has a kid's store called Kitson Kids on Robertson and has outposts in Beverly Hills and the Pacific Palisades. 

The store carries a selection of Men's, Women's, baby, and children's clothing, including a vast assortment of gifts, toys, books, and art.

Kitson has been featured in the movie The Ring Bling and Entourage. The store's 2020 holiday window displays purporting to call out hypocritical actions by political figures such as Gavin Newsom, Nancy Pelosi, Eric Garcetti as well as others all wearing Santa Hats went viral.

References

External links
Kitson website

Clothing retailers of the United States
Companies based in Los Angeles